Kellerville is an unincorporated community in Concord Township, Adams County, Illinois, United States. Kellerville is south of Clayton and north of Siloam Springs State Park.

References

Unincorporated communities in Adams County, Illinois
Unincorporated communities in Illinois